The Otahuhu Leopards are a rugby league club based in Otahuhu, Auckland. Founded in 1911, the club has produced 49 New Zealand national rugby league team players. The club competes in the Fox Memorial competition run by Auckland Rugby League. Otahuhu has won the Fox Memorial Shield 12 times, the Rukatai Shield 16 times, Roope Rooster 12 times and the Stormont Shield 12 times.

History
The Otahuhu Leopards were founded in 1911. Their first ever Kiwi was selected in 1914 when Arthur Hardgrave played against the touring England side. He had joined Otahuhu at the start of the season after the Manukau side he was with had dropped out of first grade the season prior. 1930 saw the club win its first ever senior grade trophy when their top side won the Senior B competition. In 1943, playing in blue and white, Otahuhu produced their first Fox Memorial side though they had played as a combined City Rovers-Otahuhu side in the Fox Memorial competition in 1942 due to there being so many players away at World War II. The Auckland Rugby League forced several mergers for that season. By 1945 Otahuhu had won their first Fox Memorial title. In that year the team featured four brothers Ivan, Joffre, Mick, and Norm Johnson, along with brothers Dick and Jim Fogarty (also captain). In 1946 their first Kiwi's were selected, Toff Johnson and Claude Hancox who toured Britain and France in 1947–48.

Otahuhu Leopards is where Kiwi coach Graham Lowe first made a name for himself coaching U18s in 1974 and becoming a first grade coach in 1977, winning the Fox Memorial competition in his first year.

Bartercard Cup
With the creation of the Bartercard Cup in 2000 by the New Zealand Rugby League the Leopards were one of the seven Auckland sides invited to join. They dominated the competition in the inaugural season, finishing up Minor Premiers before going down to the Canterbury Bulls in the Grand Final. More heartbreak was to follow for the club, losing in the Elimination Play-off and the Preliminary Final the next two seasons before missing the final series all together in 2003.

Otahuhu Ellerslie Leopards
In 2004 the Counties Manukau Jetz replaced the Manurewa Marlins in the competition. As a result, the number of clubs involved with the Eastern Tornadoes increased and the clubs orientation shifted southwards. The Ellerslie Eagles left this franchise and joined with Otahuhu to form the Otahuhu Ellerslie Leopards. The club made the finals again, again losing in the Preliminary Final. In 2005 the club missed the finals for the second time in three seasons.

Tamaki Leopards

In 2006 the number of Auckland Bartercard Cup sides was reduced from eight to five. This resulted in the Otahuhu-Ellerslie Leopards and the Eastern Tornadoes merging to form the Tamaki Leopards franchise. In 2007 the side was renamed the Tamaki Titans and finished fifth.

Fox Memorial
The club competes in the Fox Memorial competition run by Auckland Rugby League. Otahuhu has won the Fox Memorial Shield 12 times, the Rukatai Shield 16 times, Roope Rooster 12 times and the Stormont Shield 12 times.

As a junior, Richard Blackmore who started his rugby league at Otahuhu became head coach from 2006 to 2010 successfully taking ownership of the Stormont Shield and Roope Rooster and leading the team to a Fox Memorial grand final victory over Mt Albert in 2010.

Notable players

The Otahuhu Club has had a long and proud history of producing top quality rugby league players.

Kiwi Captains
To date the Leopards have produced five captains of the New Zealand national rugby league team:

 Roy Christian (1970–1972)
 Mark Graham (1980–1986)
 Hugh McGahan (1985–1990)
 Richard Barnett (1999–2000)
 Ruben Wiki (2003–2005)

Other players

 Arthur Hardgrave - debuted in 1914
 Bill Cloke - debuted in 1917
 Leeson Ah Mau
 Tawera Nikau – debuted in 1989
 Manu Vatuvei – debuted in 2005
 Thomas Leuluai – debuted in 2003
 Clinton Toopi – debuted in 2001
 Sam Kasiano – debuted in 2012
 Frank Paul Nuuausala – debuted in 2009
 Elijah Taylor – debuted in 2011
 Roger Tuivasa-Sheck – debuted in 2013
 George Carmont – debuted in 2004
 Cooper Vuna – debuted in 2004
 Motootua Gray - debuted in 2001

Season records

Otahuhu Senior Team Records (1912-1943, 2000-2007, 2022)
The season record for the most senior men’s team in the club.

Club titles (1912-43)

21 championship titles
1913 Fourth Grade
1916 Second Grade
1918 Second Grade and Fifth Grade
1921 Fourth Grade
1924 Second Grade 
1926 Schoolboys (Senior)
1927 Schoolboys (Senior)
1930 B Division (Norton Cup)
1934 Second Grade (Wright Cup)
1935 Senior B (Sharman Cup)
1936 Seventh Grade
1937 Third Grade and Fifth Grade
1938 Senior B (Sharman Cup)
1939 Senior B (Sharman Cup) and Third Grade (Open)
1940 Senior B (Sharman Cup) and Third Grade (Open)
1941 Senior B (Sharman Cup) and Third Grade (Open)

All time top point scorers (1914-17, 1919, 1931, 1942-43)
The point scoring lists are compiled from matches played in matches from the first grade championship, the Roope Rooster, Phelan Shield, and Sharman Cup only. One off matches and exhibition matches are not included. The matches and point scorers includes the combined Otahuhu-Ellerslie side of 1931, and the combined Otahuhu-City side of 1942.

References

External links
 Official Site
 Auckland Rugby League

 
Rugby clubs established in 1911
1911 establishments in New Zealand